Nord 4.2016 to 4.2095 were a class of 0-8-0T locomotives of the Chemin de fer du Nord.

History

The eighty locomotives were built from 1930 until 1933, and were used for shunting in yards and depots. The Nord numbered them  4.2016 to 4.2095; in 1938 they passed to the SNCF who renumbered them 2-040.TG.1 to 2-040.TG.80.

They were all scrapped between 1960 and 1967.

References

4.2014
0-8-0T locomotives
Railway locomotives introduced in 1930
Standard gauge locomotives of France
Corpet-Louvet locomotives
ANF locomotives

Shunting locomotives 
Scrapped locomotives